"Baby, What a Big Surprise" is a power ballad written by Peter Cetera for the group Chicago and recorded for their album Chicago XI (1977), with Cetera singing lead vocals. The first single released from the album reached number 4 on the US Billboard Hot 100 chart.

Background
Carl Wilson of The Beach Boys and Cetera's brother, Tim Cetera, provided additional backing vocals on the recording while saxophonist Walt Parazaider plays flute on the distinctive introduction and trumpeter Lee Loughnane plays a piccolo trumpet.

Although Chicago XI yielded two more minor singles, "Baby, What a Big Surprise" was Chicago's last top ten single before the accidental death of guitarist Terry Kath, and was also their last Top Ten single produced by James William Guercio.

Reception
Cash Box said that "frequent repetition drives the memorable chorus home, while classically influenced strings, brass and vocals lend a stately touch."  Record World said that "the interesting structure and chorus hook" explain why the song was a popular song on pop music radio stations even before it was released as a single.

Personnel
 Peter Cetera - lead vocals, orchestration, backing vocals
 Robert Lamm - piano
 Terry Kath - electric guitars
 Danny Seraphine - drums
 Walt Parazaider - flute
 Lee Loughnane - piccolo trumpet, backing vocals
 Carl Wilson - backing vocals
 Tim Cetera - backing vocals
 Jimmy Guercio - orchestration, acoustic guitar, bass
 Dominic Frontiere - orchestration

Chart performance

Weekly charts

Year-end charts

Cover versions
Cetera re-recorded the song as a solo artist for his 1997 album You're the Inspiration: A Collection.

References

External links
 

1977 singles
Chicago (band) songs
Rock ballads
Songs written by Peter Cetera
Song recordings produced by James William Guercio
Columbia Records singles
1977 songs